Walter Runciman may refer to:

Walter Runciman, 1st Baron Runciman (1847–1937), shipping magnate, Liberal MP, and peer
Walter Runciman, 1st Viscount Runciman of Doxford (1870–1949), son of the above, Liberal and later National Liberal MP and government minister
Walter Leslie Runciman, 2nd Viscount Runciman of Doxford (1900–1989)
Walter Garry Runciman, 3rd Viscount Runciman of Doxford, British historical sociologist